This is a list of all the Ultra prominent peaks (with topographic prominence greater than 1,500 metres) in Africa. Also shown is Mount Catherine in Sinai, Egypt which is not geographically part of Africa. Not listed here are the 5 Ultras of the Canaries and Madeira which are off the African Coast but listed under Europe.

Atlas Mountains

Mountain ranges of the Sahara

Egypt

Cape Verde islands

West Africa

Cameroon Line

Ethiopian Highland

Surrounding Western Rift Valley

Surrounding East African Rift

Southern African Plateau

Madagascar and surrounding islands

Sources
List
Map

African Ultras
 Ultras